Simón Alberto Consalvi (7 July 1927 – 11 March 2013) was a Venezuelan politician, journalist, diplomat and historian. He was Minister of Foreign Affairs of Venezuela on two occasions (1977-1979/1985-1988), Minister of Internal Affairs of Venezuela (1988–1989), Secretary of the Presidency (1988), and also held several Ambassadorships. A journalist and author of many books, he was member of the National Academy of History since 1997, and Associate Editor of the daily El Nacional.

Because of a domestic accident, Simon Alberto Consalvi died in Caracas, Venezuela on 11 March 2013  He was 85.

Partial bibliography 
“La Paz Nuclear” (1988)
“1989 / Diario de Washington” (1990)
“Pedro Manuel Arcaya y la crisis de los años 30” (1991)
“Auge y caída de Rómulo Gallegos” (1991)
“Lascivia Brevis” (1992)
“Grover Cleveland y la controversia Venezuela-Gran Bretaña” (1992)
“Los Gómez de Zapata” (1993)
“Profecía de la palabra” (1996)
“El perfil y la sombra” (1997)
“Las relaciones Venezuela-Estados Unidos en la primera mitad del siglo XX” (2000)
“Profecía de la palabra, Vida y Obra de Mariano Picón Salas” (2001)
“El Precio de la Historia” (2001)
“Historia de las relaciones exteriores de Venezuela, 1810–2000” (2001)
“Reflexiones sobre la Historia de Venezuela” (2002)
“Augusto Mijares, el pensador y su tiempo” (2003)
“El carrusel de las discordias” (2003)
“El petróleo en Venezuela” (2004)
“1957: el año en que los venezolanos perdieron el miedo” (2007)
“La Guerra de los Compadres” (2009)
“La Revolución de Octubre” (2010)

See also 

El Nacional
Monte Ávila Editores
List of Venezuelan writers 
List of Ministers of Foreign Affairs of Venezuela

References

External links

 

1927 births
2013 deaths
People from Mérida (state)
Venezuelan male writers
Venezuelan journalists
20th-century Venezuelan historians
Venezuelan Ministers of Foreign Affairs
Venezuelan Ministers of Interior
Ambassadors of Venezuela to Yugoslavia
Permanent Representatives of Venezuela to the United Nations
Ambassadors of Venezuela to the United States
Prisoners and detainees of Venezuela
21st-century Venezuelan historians
Secretariat of the Presidency ministers of Venezuela